Cophixalus cryptotympanum (common name Zweifel's rainforest frog) is a species of frog in the family Microhylidae. It is endemic to Papua New Guinea. Its natural habitat is tropical moist montane forests.

References

cryptotympanum
Amphibians of Papua New Guinea
Endemic fauna of Papua New Guinea
Taxa named by Richard G. Zweifel
Taxonomy articles created by Polbot
Amphibians described in 1956